Debebe Demisse (born 1968) is a retired Ethiopian cross country and marathon runner.

Achievements

References

External links

1968 births
Living people
Ethiopian male long-distance runners
20th-century Ethiopian people